KXSP (590 AM) is a commercial radio station licensed to Omaha, Nebraska.  The station is owned by SummitMedia and it airs a sports format.  Most weekday afternoon and evening programming is from local hosts, while during mornings, late nights and weekends, KXSP carries the ESPN Radio Network.

KXSP operates at 5,000 watts, using a non-directional transmitter off Sorensen Parkway in North Omaha.  Due to its location near the bottom of the AM dial, as well as Nebraska's flat land (with near-perfect ground conductivity), its signal is easily heard in most of the eastern half of Nebraska, as well as parts of Iowa, Missouri, Kansas and South Dakota.  It provides grade B coverage as far south as Kansas City as far east as Des Moines, and as far north as Sioux Falls.  Offices and studios are located on Mercy Road in Omaha's Aksarben Village. KXSP programming is also carried on the HD-2 subchannel of KSRZ.

History
On April 2, 1923, the station first signed on, owned by the Woodmen of the World life insurance society, using the call sign WOAW.  Management originally sought the call letters WOW (for Woodmen Of the World) but they were already used by the steamship Henry J. Bibble.  A call sign beginning with "W" was possible in Nebraska because originally the dividing line between "K" and "W" stations followed the western border of Nebraska.  WOAW's call sign was issued on November 27, 1922, shortly before the divide was moved to the Mississippi River in January 1923. Despite this, the station was able to claim the WOW call sign on December 16, 1926, upon retirement of the Bibble. The Woodmen society put the station up for sale in 1945 out of fear that it would jeopardize its tax-exempt status; it eventually leased the station to "Radio Station WOW," a group of local investors.  That group later added a television station (now WOWT) in 1949 and an FM station in 1961 (now KEZO-FM).

In 1951, Meredith Corporation bought the WOW stations. The AM station became a Top 40 station in the early 1970s, where former Shindig! host Jimmy O'Neill worked for a time, and a country station in the early 1980s. In 1955, it dropped network affiliations with NBC Radio and agreed to switch to CBS Radio as part of a five-station deal covering TV and radio stations in three cities. Meredith sold channel 6 to Chronicle Publishing Company in 1975, but held on to the radio station until selling it to Great Empire Broadcasting in 1983.  Journal Broadcast Group bought it in 1999. On November 22, 1999, the WOW call letters were dropped in favor of KOMJ with adoption of a new format of adult standards, branded as "Magic 590". On April 25, 2005, KOMJ and then-sister station KOSR (1490 AM) swapped formats, with 590 adopting the sports format (as "Big Sports 590") under new call letters KXSP, and 1490 adopting the standards format and KOMJ calls.

On February 1, 2011, KXSP swapped affiliations with KOZN; KOZN  took the Fox Sports Radio affiliation, while KXSP took ESPN. With the affiliation swap, KXSP rebranded as "AM 590 ESPN Radio".

On August 23, 2012, KXSP began airing The Front Stretch Radio Show on Sunday mornings. Originally hosted by Michael Grey, Buddy Ray Jones and Andrew Kosiski, The Front Stretch covered local dirt track racing and NASCAR.

Journal Communications and the E. W. Scripps Company announced on July 30, 2014, that the two companies would merge to create a new broadcast company under the E. W. Scripps Company name that will own the two companies' broadcast properties, including KXSP. The transaction was completed in 2015.

On February 10, 2015, Journal Broadcast Group and the IMG Group announced they had signed a contract for Journal to be the broadcast partner for Nebraska Cornhuskers sports. Effective July 1, 2015, KXSP became the primary station for Nebraska Cornhuskers sports broadcasts, sharing flagship status with Lincoln's KLIN.  Co-owned KEZO will simulcast football games, while KKCD will air any volleyball, women's basketball and baseball games that conflict with other athletic events.  This ended a nine-decade association between the Huskers and KFAB, the state's most powerful radio station.  However, school officials had long felt chagrin at KFAB's unwillingness to air all major sports, and wanted all games to air on a single, powerful station. KXSP's daytime broadcast range is almost as large as that of KFAB's. As mentioned above, this is due to Nebraska's flat land; most 5,000-watt AM stations in the Midwest have daytime footprints comparable to those of full-power FM stations.

Scripps exited radio in 2018; the Omaha stations went to SummitMedia in a four-market, $47 million deal completed on November 1, 2018.

Award
WOW received a 1946 Peabody Award for Outstanding Regional Public Service for its program series "Operation Big Muddy."

References

External links
AM 590 ESPN Radio Official Website
History of WOW

FCC History Cards for KXSP

XSP
Radio stations established in 1923
Woodmen of the World
ESPN Radio stations